Greig Hicks (born August 10, 1933) is a Canadian former professional hockey player who played 285 games for the Chicoutimi Sagueneens in the Quebec Hockey League between 1954 and 1959. He was the league's leading scorer in int 1958–59 season, with 86 points. He also played for the Cleveland Barons and Buffalo Bisons of the American Hockey League

External links
 

1933 births
Living people
Buffalo Bisons (AHL) players
Canadian ice hockey centres
Chicoutimi Saguenéens (QSHL) players
Cleveland Barons (1937–1973) players
Ice hockey people from Ontario
Sportspeople from Timmins